Dried turnip (dried radish) is one kind of pickles in China, also a kind of vegetables with unique flavor. It is rich in both Vitamin B and iron.

Procedure
Dried turnip is usually made around the winter solstice. Turnips are cleaned before solarization. Then the turnips are mixed with salt and put them into a jar with a big rock upon them. One week later, turnips are taken out and dried in the sun again. Then the turnips are squeezed until no water can be squeezed. Next, turnips should are soaked in boiling brine. The turnips are again squeezed and dried in the sun until they become golden yellow. The last procedure is to put turnips into a clean jar. Half a year later, they can be tasted.

Use
In China, people eat dried turnips when they are having porridge or noddles. It is regarded as an appetizer. The quality guarantee period of the dried turnip is months or even years. People are advised  to pay attention to the amount of the dried turnip you eat because too much pickle is not good for health.

References 
 Xiaoshan Air-dried Turnip
 About Chinese Food: Dried Turnip
 Chiayi County: Dried Turnip of Budai, Taiwan

Chinese cuisine